Jeffrey Scott Passan (born September 21, 1980) is an American baseball columnist with ESPN and author of New York Times Best Seller The Arm: Inside the Billion-Dollar Mystery of the Most Valuable Commodity in Sports. He is also co-author of Death to the BCS: The Definitive Case Against the Bowl Championship Series.

Career 
After graduating from Solon High School near Cleveland, Ohio, Passan wrote for The Daily Orange at Syracuse University before covering Fresno State basketball. He began covering baseball in 2004 at The Kansas City Star, before moving to Yahoo! two years later. After 13 years at Yahoo! (2006–18), he announced that he was joining ESPN's Baseball team in January 2019. In early 2022, Passan signed a four-year, four million dollar contract with ESPN. While working at ESPN, he makes guest appearances on SportsCenter, Get Up (TV program), The Rich Eisen Show, and other ESPN studio shows. In 2018, while working for Yahoo!, Passan refused to cast his ballot for the Baseball Hall of Fame. He has spoken out about the Baseball Hall of Fame's hypocrisy against players like Barry Bonds and Roger Clemens in addition to his reporting on current Major League Baseball teams and players.

Awards and Recognitions 
Jeff Passan has been a member of the Baseball Writers' Association of America since 2004, while he was at The Kansas City Star. The National Sports Media Association named Passan as the 2021 National Sportswriter of the Year. Jeff Passan received the 2022 Dan Jenkins medal for Excellence in Sportswriting for his ESPN article, "San Francisco Giants Outfielder Drew Robinson's Remarkable Second Act."

Personal Life 
Passan's family is Jewish. Passan graduated from Syracuse University's S. I. Newhouse School of Public Communications in 2002 with a degree in journalism.

References

External links

1980 births
Living people
American sports journalists
Jewish American journalists
ESPN people
Online journalists
Yahoo! employees
S.I. Newhouse School of Public Communications alumni
Place of birth missing (living people)
The Kansas City Star people
Sportswriters from New York (state)
21st-century American Jews
21st-century American journalists